Lavinia Crosse (1821 - 1890) founded the Community of All Hallows in Ditchingham in 1855. She was the daughter of the famous Norwich surgeon, John Green Crosse.

In March 1854 she heard John Armstrong speak at the Norwich assembly rooms in support of a founding a penitentiary at Shipmeadow, near Beccles Suffolk, to rescue girls and women in moral danger. Shortly after, on 9 January 1855, Lavinia Crosse was asked by the council of the penitentiary to supervise this home, as the founder wished to withdraw.

Visits to similar penitentiaries and convents on the continent convinced Lavinia Crosse that the best way forward was as a religious sisterhood. New Year's Eve 1855 saw the inauguration of the Community of All Hallows by T. T. Carter of Clewer—Mother Lavinia and two novices being received.

References

External links 
 Lavinia Crosse and Community of All Hallows

19th-century English people
People from Ditchingham
1821 births
1890 deaths